John Dennison may refer to:

  John Dennison, a New Zealand poet
  John Dennison, a New Zealand politician